A list films produced in Argentina in 1979:

External links and references
 Argentine films of 1979 at the Internet Movie Database

1979
Argentine
Films